Joe Hudson may refer to:
Joe Hudson (catcher) (born 1991), Major League Baseball catcher
Joe Hudson (pitcher) (born 1970), Major League Baseball pitcher
Joe Hudson (racing driver) (born 1966), American professional stock car racing driver
Joe Hudson (Shortland Street), fictional character

See also
Joseph Hudson (disambiguation)